Kate Mahaut (16 January 1908 – 2 March 1988) was a Danish fencer. She competed in the women's individual foil events at the 1948 and 1952 Summer Olympics.

References

1908 births
1988 deaths
Danish female foil fencers
Olympic fencers of Denmark
Fencers at the 1948 Summer Olympics
Fencers at the 1952 Summer Olympics
Sportspeople from Frederiksberg